The World Figure Skating Championships is an annual figure skating competition sanctioned by the International Skating Union in which figure skaters compete for the title of World Champion.

The competitions took place from February 3 to 5 in New York City, the first figure skating world championships in the United States. It was also the first year when all competitions were held at the same location and at the same time. All the judges for the three competitions were also the same.

Results

Men

Judges:
 J. Edhoffer 
 Herbert J. Clarke 
 J. B. Liberman 
 J. C. McDougall 
 B. Börjeson

Ladies

Judges:
 J. Edhoffer 
 Herbert J. Clarke 
 J. B. Liberman 
 J. C. McDougall 
 B. Börjeson

Pairs

Judges:
 B. Börjeson 
 J. Edhoffer 
 Herbert J. Clarke 
 J. C. McDougall 
 J. B. Liberman

Sources
 Result List provided by the ISU

World Figure Skating Championships
World Figure Skating Championships
International figure skating competitions hosted by the United States
World Figure Skating Championships
World Figure Skating Championships
World Figure Skating Championships
Sports competitions in New York City
International sports competitions in New York (state)